The 2021 UK & Ireland Greyhound Racing Year was the 96th year of greyhound racing in the Greyhound racing in the United Kingdom and Greyhound racing in Ireland.

Roll of honour

Summary
The main news throughout the year was the announcement of a five-year deal between Entain and ARC for a new joint venture of live broadcast rights from 1 January 2024 until 31 December 2029. The deal was described in some news articles as revamping and revitalising greyhound racing's wider betting appeal but in truth the deal although inevitable (a bookmaker owned industry had been predicted 20 years previously) was potentially a serious problem for a third of the industry. The deal in detail meant that the Entain/Ladbrokes Coral owned tracks (Crayford, Hove, Monmore and Romford) and the ARC tracks (Newcastle, Nottingham, Perry Barr and Sunderland) would form eight of the tracks with broadcast rights and they would likely be joined by two to four more tracks. This would mean that a further six to eight tracks would be financially unstable with no broadcast rights and would face an uncertain future. Shortly after the announcement Central Park Stadium was acquired by ARC, leaving Doncaster, Harlow, Henlow, Kinsley, Sheffield, Pelaw Grange, Shawfield, Swindon, Towcester and Yarmouth battling for rights before 2024.

The major disruption caused by the COVID-19 pandemic continued with racing remaining behind closed doors until the return of crowds was allowed on 17 May. The Derby returned to Towcester Greyhound Stadium following two years at Nottingham. The 2021 English Greyhound Derby was won by Thorn Falcon for Belgian born Patrick Janssens, thwarting an Irish attempt at a third consecutive success.

News
Just one week after being named the 2020 Greyhound of the Year Aayamza Royale broke the 900 metres track record at Monmore, recording 55.95 seconds. In May 2021 Kevin Hutton returned to train out of Towcester following its reopening and later in September 2021, won his fourth trainers championship (the first as the rebranded Judgement Night).

Towcester and Henlow owner Kevin Boothby announced his intention to re-open Oxford Stadium and Mildenhall Stadium (the latter would be known as Suffolk Downs) with renovation work beginning on the tracks in July, which continued until the end of the year. Originally he had hoped to open both tracks before Christmas but this did not materialise.

The Oaks was switched from Swindon to Perry Barr due to the ongoing saga surrounding Swindon's redevelopment. 

Mark Wallis extended his Greyhound Trainer of the Year record to twelve titles.

Competitions

Ireland
The Champion Stakes was positioned in the racing calendar just before the Irish Derby and would give a great indication as to the form heading into the event. De Machine won the final, which contained six serious contenders for the Derby. Susie Sapphire was arguably the star in Ireland, after winning the Oaks she went unbeaten throughout the 2021 Irish Greyhound Derby and duly won the Irish greyhound of the year. Others that had a great year were Good Cody, Priceless Jet and Explosive Boy; Cody won the Sprint Cup and Kingdom Derby as well as reaching the Produce final; Priceless Jet was a St Leger and Champions Stakes finalist and won the Corn Cuchulainn; Explosive Boy reached the Irish Derby and Kirby finals and won the Produce.

UK
Havana Class won the first Laurels to be staged at Perry Barr in April and shortly afterwards trainer Ricky Holloway won his fourth Grand National, this time with Meenagh Maverick. In May, Aayamza Royale became the fourth greyhound to win the TV Trophy twice, also setting a record of fours wins for trainer Mark Wallis in the process. Royale broke the track record to complete a memorable feat. In July, Aayamza Royale continued her stunning form by winning the £10,000 Regency. 

Aayamza Royale was the leading contender to become the first greyhound since Westmead Hawk to win Greyhound of the Year for two consecutive years. She would be challenged by Space Jet (a newcomer that won the St Leger in a track record time), Thorn Falcon (the Derby champion), Signet Ace and Salacres Pippy. The award went to Signet Ace, who had claimed the Winter Derby, Eclipse and Select Stakes.

Principal UK finals

Principal Irish finals

UK Category 1 & 2 competitions

Irish feature competitions

References 

Greyhound racing in the United Kingdom
Greyhound racing in the Republic of Ireland
UK and Ireland Greyhound Racing Year
UK and Ireland Greyhound Racing Year
2021 in greyhound racing